Pavel Maláč (born June 15, 1973) is a Czech former professional ice hockey goaltender.

Maláč played a total of 57 games in the Czechoslovak First Ice Hockey League and the Czech Extraliga for HC Zlín, ASD Dukla Jihlava, HC Oceláři Třinec and HC Havířov Panthers. He also played in the 1993 World Junior Ice Hockey Championships for the Czechs and Slovaks Republic, winning a bronze medal.

His son Filip Maláč is also a goaltender who plays for Dukla Jihlava.

References

External links

1973 births
Living people
HC Bílí Tygři Liberec players
Czech ice hockey goaltenders
HC Dukla Jihlava players
SHK Hodonín players
HC Kometa Brno players
HC Havířov players
Czechoslovak ice hockey goaltenders
LHK Jestřábi Prostějov players
HC Oceláři Třinec players
People from Orlová
Piráti Chomutov players
Hokej Šumperk 2003 players
PSG Berani Zlín players
Sportspeople from the Moravian-Silesian Region